Lian Cheng Jue may refer to:

 A Deadly Secret, known as Lian Cheng Jue (or Liancheng Jue) in Chinese, is a novel by Jin Yong. Alternate English translations of the title include Secret of the Linked Cities and Requiem of Ling Sing.
 Adaptations of the novel:
 A Deadly Secret (film), a 1980 Hong Kong film
 Deadly Secret, a 1989 Hong Kong television series
 Lian Cheng Jue (TV series), a 2004 Chinese television series